Rosa-Maria Ryyti (born 13 June 1994) is a Finnish designer, model and beauty pageant titleholder who was crowned Miss Finland 2015 and represented Finland at the Miss Universe 2015 pageant.

Personal life
Ryyti currently works as an interior designer in Finland. She graduated from college with a degree in Interior Design.

Miss Finland 2015
On 12 April 2015, Ryyti was crowned Miss Finland 2015 in Helsinki. She was also automatically crowned as Miss Universe Finland.

Miss Universe 2015
Ryyti represented Finland at the Miss Universe 2015 pageant on December 20, 2015, in Las Vegas, United States, but failed to place in the Top 15.

References

External links
Official Miss Suomi website

1994 births
Living people
People from Oulu
Miss Finland winners
Miss Universe 2015 contestants